General elections were held in the Territory of Papua and New Guinea on 18 March 1961. Indigenous members were elected for the first time, although on an indirect basis. The territory's first political party, the United Progress Party, won three seats.

Background
In September 1960 the Australian government announced that the Legislative Council would be expanded. Having previously been a 29-member body with 17 officials (civil servants), nine appointed members and three elected members, the new council was to have 37 members, of which 15 were officials, 10 were appointees (of which at least five would be indigenous members) and twelve were elected. The twelve elected members would consist of six Europeans elected directly from single-member constituencies, and six indigenous members indirectly elected from the same constituencies.

The indirect elections for the indigenous members saw 220 representatives nominated by 39 Native Local Government Council and 144 representatives nominated by 33 special electoral groups, covering areas where no Native Local Government Council existed. The 364 representatives subsequently elected the six indigenous members of the Legislative Council.

Campaign
A total of 108 candidates contested the six indigenous seats, whilst only nine ran in the six European seats, leaving three candidates elected unopposed.

Results

Nominated members

Aftermath
Following the elections, the Administrator appointed the Administrator's Council, the territory's cabinet.

References

Papua
1961 in Papua New Guinea
Elections in Papua New Guinea
March 1961 events in Oceania
Election and referendum articles with incomplete results